Bulbophyllum johnsonii, commonly known as the yellow snake orchid, is a species of epiphytic or lithophytic orchid that has a thin, creeping rhizome with flattened pseudobulbs, each with a single tough, dark green leaf and a single bright yellow to orange flower on a thread-like stalk. It grows on trees, shrubs and rocks in and near rainforest in tropical North Queensland.

Description
Flowering occurs sporadically throughout the year.

Taxonomy and naming
Bulbophyllum johnsonii was first formally described in 1950 by Trevor Edgar Hunt who published the description in Proceedings of the Royal Society of Queensland from a specimen collected at Hambledon by "A. E. Johnson". The specific epithet (johnsonii) honours the collector of the type specimen.

Distribution and habitat
The yellow snake orchid usually grows on trees, shrubs and rocks in rainforest and open forest, at higher altitudes between the Cedar Bay National Park and the Paluma Range National Park.

References

johnsonii
Orchids of Queensland
Endemic orchids of Australia
Plants described in 1950